John Quested (born 1935) has been the owner and chairman of Goldcrest Films since the early 1990s. He began his career as a third assistant director on The Concrete Jungle in 1960 and has gone on to produce many feature films over the course of his career.

Filmography

Producer
Elvis and Anabelle (2007) (executive producer)
Milk and Honey (2003) (executive producer)
To End All Wars (2001) (executive producer)
Bring Me the Head of Mavis Davis (1997) (executive producer)
Clockwatchers (1997) (co-executive producer) (uncredited)
Driftwood (1997) (executive producer)
No Way Home (1996) (executive producer)
Scorchers (1991) (executive producer) 
Rock-a-Doodle (1991) (executive producer)
Black Rainbow (1989) (producer)
American Gothic (1987) (producer) 
The Return of the Soldier (1982) (executive producer)
Sunburn (1979) (executive producer)
The Passage (1979) (producer)
The Bitch (1979) (producer)
Leopard in the Snow (1978) (producer)
The Brute (1977) (producer)
All the Right Noises (1969) (producer)

Second Unit Director or Assistant Director
Bedazzled (1967) (assistant director)
You Only Live Twice (1967) (first assistant director: second unit) (uncredited)
Sands of Beersheba (1966) (assistant director) 
The Heroes of Telemark (1965) (assistant director) (uncredited)
Young Cassidy (1965) (assistant director)
Of Human Bondage (1964) (assistant director)
The Ceremony (1963) (assistant director)
The L-Shaped Room (1962) (assistant director)
Spare the Rod (1961) (second assistant director) (uncredited)
The Concrete Jungle (1960) (third assistant director) (uncredited)

Director
Loophole (1981)
Philadelphia, Here I Come (1975)

Production Manager
The Lion in Winter (production supervisor)
The Running Man (1963) (unit manager)

References

Living people
1935 births
British film producers
British film directors